Karina Vnukova (born 27 March 1985 in Vilnius, Lithuania) is a Lithuanian high jumper.

She finished eighth at the 2001 World Youth Championships. She later competed at the 2007 European Indoor Championships and the 2008 Olympic Games without reaching the final.

Her personal best is 1.87 metres, achieved in July 2008 in Strasbourg. She has 1.91 metres on the indoor track, achieved in January 2008 in Vilnius.

Achievements

References

1985 births
Living people
Sportspeople from Vilnius
Lithuanian female high jumpers
Athletes (track and field) at the 2008 Summer Olympics
Olympic athletes of Lithuania
Competitors at the 2009 Summer Universiade